Jakkanahalli is a small village in Mandya district of Karnataka state, India.

Location
Jakkanahalli is located between Nagamangala and Pandavapura near to Melukote.

Post office
There is a post office in Jakkanahalli and the pin code is 571431.

Distance
Jakkanahalli is about 32 km from the district headquarters of Mandya and 20 km from the nearest town of Pandavapura.  It is 122 km from Bangalore, the state capital. Jakkanahalli Pin code is 571807 and postal head office is Kirangoor .

Villages and suburbs
 Chinya - 6 km
 G.Malligere - 8 km
 Halebeedu - 8 km
 Muthegere - 13 km
 Haralahalli - 13 km

Railway Station
The nearest railway station is pandavapura at a distance of 18 km.

Education
Vijaya College, Pandavapura. 
Kitturu Rani Channamma School, Halebeedu. 
B.Capital School, Manikana Hally. 
Morarji HP School, Pandavapura. 
Vidyanikethana Highschool, Y.H.Koppalu.

See also
 Yeliyur

References

Villages in Mandya district